Louise Thibault (born 1946) is a Canadian politician. Born in Montreal, Quebec, Thibault was a city councillor in Le Bic in 2003, then was elected into the House of Commons of Canada in the 2004 Canadian federal election for the Bloc Québécois in the riding of Rimouski-Neigette—Témiscouata—Les Basques. A former senior public servant, Thibault was the Bloc's critic of the Minister of Public Works and Government Services.

Thibault resigned from the Bloc Québécois caucus on April 12, 2007 and sat as an independent. She ran in the 2008 election as an independent, but was defeated by Claude Guimond, the new Bloc Québécois candidate.

References

External links
 

1947 births
Bloc Québécois MPs
Women members of the House of Commons of Canada
French Quebecers
Independent MPs in the Canadian House of Commons
Living people
Members of the House of Commons of Canada from Quebec
People from Rimouski
Politicians from Montreal
Quebec municipal councillors
Women in Quebec politics
Women municipal councillors in Canada
21st-century Canadian politicians
21st-century Canadian women politicians